The 1994 San Diego Padres season was the 26th season in franchise history.

Offseason
 November 18, 1993: Jarvis Brown was selected off waivers from the Padres by the Atlanta Braves.
 November 18, 1993: Darrell Sherman was selected off waivers from the Padres by the Colorado Rockies.
December 10, 1993: Frank Seminara was traded by the San Diego Padres with a player to be named later and Tracy Sanders (minors) to the New York Mets for a player to be named later and Randy Curtis (minors). The New York Mets sent Marc Kroon (December 13, 1993) to the San Diego Padres to complete the trade. The San Diego Padres sent Pablo Martinez (December 13, 1993) to the New York Mets to complete the trade.
December 17, 1993: Kevin Elster was signed as a free agent with the San Diego Padres.
January 20, 1994: Jeff Gardner was released by the Padres.
March 21, 1994: Kevin Elster was released by the San Diego Padres.

Regular season

By Friday, August 12, the Padres had compiled a record of 47-70 through 117 games. They had scored 479 runs (4.09 per game) and allowed 531 runs (4.54 per game). They were also leading the majors in at-bats at the time, with 4,068. They also drew the fewest walks in the majors, with 319, and tied the New York Yankees for the most double plays grounded into, with 112.

Opening Day starters
Brad Ausmus
Derek Bell
Andy Benes
Archi Cianfrocco
Ricky Gutiérrez
Tony Gwynn
Phil Plantier
Bip Roberts
Dave Staton

Season standings

Record vs. opponents

Notable transactions
 April 13, 1994: Kevin Maas was signed as a free agent by the Padres.
 May 11, 1994: Gene Harris was traded by the Padres to the Detroit Tigers for Jorge Velandia and Scott Livingstone.
 May 20, 1994: Mackey Sasser was signed as a free agent by the Padres.
 May 23, 1994: Kevin Maas was released by the Padres.
 May 24, 1994: Mark Davis was released by the Padres.
 June 26, 1994: Mackey Sasser was released by the Padres.

Roster

Player stats

Batting

Starters by position
Note: Pos = Position; G = Games played; AB = At bats; H = Hits; Avg. = Batting average; HR = Home runs; RBI = Runs batted in

Other batters 
Note: G = Games played; AB = At bats; H = Hits; Avg. = Batting average; HR = Home runs; RBI = Runs batted in

Pitching

Starting pitchers 
Note: G = Games pitched; IP = Innings pitched; W = Wins; L = Losses; ERA = Earned run average; SO = Strikeouts

Other pitchers
Note: G = Games pitched; IP = Innings pitched; W = Wins; L = Losses; ERA = Earned run average; SO = Strikeouts

Relief pitchers 
Note: G = Games pitched; W = Wins; L = Losses; SV = Saves; ERA = Earned run average; SO = Strikeouts

Awards and honors
 Andy Benes, National League strikeout champion (189)
 Tony Gwynn, National League batting champion, (.394)
1994 Major League Baseball All-Star Game

Farm system

LEAGUE CHAMPIONS: Rancho Cucamonga

References

External links
 1994 San Diego Padres at Baseball Reference
 1994 San Diego Padres at Baseball Almanac

San Diego Padres seasons
San Diego Padres season
San Diego Padres